Molecule Man may refer to
Molecule Man, a Marvel Comics character
Molecule Man (sculpture), a sculpture by Jonathan Borofsky
Molecule Man (video game), a computer game released by Mastertronic in 1986